Herne Bay Steamboat Co v Hutton [1903] 2 KB 683 is a case on the subject of frustration of purpose. It is one of a group of cases arising out of the same event, known as the coronation cases.

Facts
The defendant, Mr Hutton, contracted to hire a steamship, named Cynthia, on 28 and 29 June 1902. This was following a public announcement that a Royal naval review was to take place at Spithead on that day.  The contract was "for the purpose of viewing the naval review and for a day's cruise round the fleet".  Following the cancellation of the coronation, and of the naval review, the defendants refused payment, stating the contract was frustrated in purpose.

Judgment
Whilst at first instance the defendant succeeded in this argument, it was reversed by the Court of Appeal, who deemed the contract was not frustrated, and the balance in full was due to the plaintiff.  At first this may seem contradictory to Krell v Henry.  However, it can be explained by reference to the agreement the parties reached; the hiring was not merely to witness the naval review, but also for a cruise around the fleet.  This purpose was still entirely possible, as explained by Stirling LJ:

It has also been suggested that the different attitudes of the court in both cases partially stemmed from the fact that Henry was acting in a purely personal capacity, whereas Hutton was acting in a business capacity.

See also

Krell v Henry
Chandler v Webster
 Frustration in English law

Notes

English frustration case law
1903 in case law
Court of Appeal (England and Wales) cases
1903 in British law